Badaguichiri is a village and rural commune in Niger.

References

Commune rurale de Badaguichiri : un centre commercial de renom. Dubois Touraoua, ONEP Tahoua-Agadez, Le Sahel, 2011-07-08.

Communes of Niger